The Norse-American Centennial celebration was held at the Minnesota State Fair on June 6–9, 1925.

Description
The event served to commemorate the 100th anniversary of the arrival during 1825 of the Norwegian immigrant ship Restauration.  The arrival of this ship is generally considered the first organized emigration of Norwegian-Americans to the United States. Gisle C. J. Bothne, Department head and professor of Scandinavian languages and literature at the University of Minnesota, was President of the Norse-American Centennial celebration. 

Johan Andreas Holvik, professor at Concordia College in Moorhead, Minnesota served as the Secretary of the national administration committee of the Norse-American Centennial. Knut Gjerset,  professor at Luther College and curator of the Vesterheim Norwegian-American Museum, served as Director of the Norse-American Centennial celebration. The committee of advisors included author O. E. Rolvaag . 

During his appearance at the Norse-American Centennial, President Calvin Coolidge gave recognition to the contributions of Scandinavian-Americans and noted  Leif Erikson as the Discoverer of America. Music was provided by musical groups from a number of Norwegian Lutheran colleges including St. Olaf College, Luther College, Augustana College and Augsburg Seminary. A pageant at the celebration centered on the life of war hero Colonel Hans Christian Heg. Colonel Heg, a Norwegian immigrant, served as  brigade commander 15th Wisconsin Volunteer Regiment during the American Civil War. The Norse-American Centennial Art exhibited works by a number of prominent Norwegian-American artist including Lars Jonson Haukaness, Karl Ouren, Svend Rasmussen Svendsen, Paul Fjelde and Benjamin Blessum. 

Mabel Johnson Leland served as State Chair of the Woman's Auxiliary.

Other commemorative activities
The United States Post Office issued two commemorative stamps in conjunction with the Norse-American Centennial.  The illustration on the two cent stamp was an artist's rendition of what the ship Restauration probably looked like based on a drawing of its sister ship. The design on the five cent stamp was from a photograph of the Viking, a ship that sailed from Norway to Chicago in time for the Columbian Exposition of 1893.

Norse-American Centennial medals were also authorized by the United States Congress. Four different octagonal-shaped medals were produced by  the U.S. Mint. Minnesota Congressman Ole J. Kvale, a member of the Congressional Coin, Weights, and Measures Committee, was instrumental in the production of the Norse-American medal series. Congress authorized the production of 40,000 silver medals and 100 gold medals, all to be produced at the Philadelphia Mint.

The celebration helped provide the impetus for a memorial church which resulted in the building of The Norwegian Lutheran Memorial Church of Minneapolis better known as Mindekirken. This Norwegian language Lutheran church was dedicated on May 4, 1930.

References

Other sources
Norlie, Olaf M. Why We Celebrate (Minneapolis, MN. Norse-American Centennial. 1925)
Arneson, Oscar  Norse-American Centennial 1825–1925 (Minneapolis, MN. Norse-American Centennial. 1925)

External links 
Norwegian-American Historical Association (NAHA) - Norse-American Centennial papers
Minnesota Digital Library + NAHA - Norse-American Centennial Digital Collection
1925 Norse-American Centennial medal
Norse-American Centennial stamps
Official Centennial Souvenir Program

1925 in Minnesota
Festivals in Minnesota
Norwegian-American culture in Minnesota
Postage stamps of the United States
Minnesota State Fair
June 1925 events
United States historical anniversaries